4,5-Dichloro-1,2,3-dithiazolium chloride (Appel's salt) is an organosulfur compound. It is the chloride salt of the 4,5-dichloro-1,2,3-dithiazolium cation. It is a green solid that is poorly soluble in organic solvents.

Synthesis
The compound is obtained by the reaction of acetonitrile with sulfur monochloride.  The initial phases of this reaction entail chlorination of the acetonitrile.  The resulting dichloroacetonitrile undergoes cycloaddition with sulfur monochloride:

The cation is highly electrophilic. It hydrolyzes readily.  Protic nucleophiles displace one chloride:

The compound was discovered by Appel et al.

References

Sulfur heterocycles
Nitrogen heterocycles
Heterocyclic compounds with 1 ring
Chlorides
Organochlorides
Sulfur–nitrogen compounds